The Chief Minister of Northern Province, Sri Lanka, is the head of the provincial board of ministers, a body which aids and advises the governor, the head of the provincial government, in the exercise of his executive power. The governor appoints as chief minister the member of the Northern Provincial Council who, in his opinion, commands the support of a majority of that council.

Chief ministers

Notes

References

External links
 

 
Northern